Andre Royo (born July 18, 1968) is an American actor, producer, and writer. He is best known for his role as Reginald "Bubbles" Cousins on the HBO crime drama series The Wire, and his appearances on Fringe, Party Down, How to Make It in America, and the 2013 film The Spectacular Now. Royo also appeared as Lucious Lyon's (Terrence Howard) defense attorney Thirsty Rawlings on the FOX drama series Empire.

Personal life
Royo was born in the borough of the Bronx in New York City on July 18, 1968, and is of African American and Cuban heritage. According to Royo, in auditions he had been told by some casting directors that he was "not Black enough" or "not Latino enough" for certain parts.

Royo attended Mount Saint Michael Academy in The Bronx from 1982 until 1986. Royo is married to Jane Choi and they have one daughter named Stella.

Career
Royo made his acting debut in a minor role in the 1998 film L.A. Without a Map. In 1999, he made one-episode guest appearances on the television series Law & Order and Third Watch. Additionally, in the Law & Order episode 'Prince of Darkness', Royo can be seen sitting in the audience of the courtroom, directly behind the defendant. In 2000, he had a small role in John Singleton's remake of the 1971 blaxploitation film Shaft. He also appeared in the 2002 movie G, which was based on The Great Gatsby.

Royo is mostly known for his starring role on the HBO crime-drama series The Wire as the drug addict and confidential informant Reginald "Bubbles" Cousins, a regular character since the show's first season. Royo's portrayal of this character was so convincing that, during on-location filming, he was once approached by a Baltimore resident and given a small package of heroin, with the man saying to the in-character Royo: "Man, you need this more than I do." Royo has called this incident his "street Oscar."

In 2008, he made a brief appearance in Terminator: The Sarah Connor Chronicles as a soldier in a unit that was sent back in time. That same year, he was introduced as the character Stephen Canfield during the third season of the television series Heroes. In 2008, Royo also played the role of a drug addicted homeless serial killer in the Criminal Minds season 4 episode "Catching Out".

In October 2009, Royo was featured at a Harvard University panel discussion along with fellow actors from The Wire Sonja Sohn and Michael K. Williams. The panel discussed the value of The Wire as a media source at-risk youth can relate to and learn positive life lessons from. In 2010, Royo guest starred on the Starz original series Party Down. Later that year, he was a guest star in the third season premiere as well as the seventh and eighteenth episodes of the Fox television series Fringe, playing a cab driver in the parallel universe.

In 2012, Royo appeared in the NBC police drama Prime Suspect as Santana Cordero, an accused murderer killing witnesses before he was tried. He appears in the 2012 film Red Tails as Antwan "Coffee" Coleman. Royo then starred as a bully's alcoholic father in a Key & Peele sketch. In 2013, Royo portrayed geometry teacher Mr. Aster in the 2013 romantic-comedy drama film The Spectacular Now. Royo was a guest, playing Otis in the episode "Trading Faces" on Paul Scheer's action comedy series NTSF:SD:SUV:: on Cartoon Network's late-night block Adult Swim. He then was a guest voice in the Bob's Burgers episode "Nude Beach" playing himself, and then voiced an exterminator named Marcus in a 2014 episode titled "Tina and the Real Ghost". He appeared in the 2015 drama film Lila & Eve, as a character named Skaketti, alongside Jennifer Lopez and Viola Davis.

In 2015, Royo appeared in Marvel's Agent Carter series portraying Spider Raymond, who ran the night club "La Martinique", but he became more notorious for being an illegal trader. He also appeared in Showtime's Happyish as Barry, mutual friend of the main characters, Thom and Lee Payne. In Amazon Prime's Hand of God, Royo portrayed San Vincente's Mayor Robert "Bobo" Boston. On Fox's Empire, he played Thirsty Rawlings, a shifty defense attorney.

In 2016 Royo won a Special Jury Award at the SXSW Film Festival for his role in Hunter Gatherer.

He appears alongside Octavia Spencer in the Apple TV+ series Truth Be Told, where he portrays an attorney.

Filmography

Film

Television

References

External links

Living people
Male actors from New York City
African-American male actors
American male film actors
American male television actors
American people of Cuban descent
Hispanic and Latino American male actors
People from the Bronx
20th-century American male actors
21st-century American male actors
20th-century African-American people
21st-century African-American people
1968 births